Saly (also called Sali or Saly Portudal) is a seaside resort area in Thiès Region on the Petite Côte of Senegal, south of Dakar. It is the top tourist destination in all of West Africa and has the status of a commune.

History
Saly was originally a Portuguese trading post known as Porto de Ale, which became Portudal, and later Sali Portudal.

On February 24, 1984, the resort was created on a previously unoccupied tract of land near the former trading post. It was about this time that tourism began to take off in Senegal.

Administration

Saly is part of M'bour, Thiès.

Flora
The resort is located on a sandy beach lined with coconut palm trees.

Population
The population is difficult to quantify because of the constant stream of tourists in and out of the area as well as the number of temporary residents. It has been suggested that an average of 20,000 people live in the area at any given time. The resident population was counted at 29,945 in the 2013 census.

Economy
Saly's economy relies almost entirely on tourism. Hotel complexes, nightclubs, bars, restaurants, shops, water sports, real estate agencies all compete for the business of wealthy visitors from other countries.

Seminars and symposiums are often held in Saly.

Social problems
The rapid development of mass tourism in a relatively poor country has had some negative consequences, such as petty crime, prostitution, pedophilia, and the spread of AIDS and other sexually transmitted diseases.

For a long time, these social problems were not discussed publicly so that the resort's reputation would not be tarnished. An observatory for the protection of children against abuse and sexual exploitation called Avenir de l'Enfant (The Child's Future) was created in M'bour by a Senegalese non-governmental organization in 2002.

In 2003, M6, a French television channel, broadcast a report focusing on Saly as part of the show Ça me révolte, meaning "That Disgusts Me". The show had hitherto focussed mainly on sex tourism in Asia.

Education

The Lycée Français Jacques Prévert, a French international school, is in Saly.

References

Bibliography

 L'Observateur

External links

Maps, weather and airports for Sali Portugal
 Saly and sexual tourism
 Web Portal dedicated to Saly Portudal

Populated places in Thiès Region
Communes of Senegal
Portuguese diaspora in Africa
Petite Côte